Marcelis Michael Catharinus Schewe (born 10 May 1969) is a former Dutch cricketer and the first Dutch wicket-keeper in international arena. He played five One Day Internationals for The Netherlands in 1996 Cricket World Cup.

References

1969 births
Living people
Dutch cricketers
Netherlands One Day International cricketers
People from Wateringen
Wicket-keepers
Sportspeople from South Holland
20th-century Dutch people